Annie Hawkins-Turner, better known by the stage name Norma Stitz, is a website entrepreneur and fetish model. Her pseudonym is a word-play on "enormous tits", a result of gigantomastia. She holds the Guinness World Record for largest natural breasts.

Career 

According to Stitz, she won a layout contest for the amateur section of Juggs magazine at the age of 37, after which she began working in the adult entertainment industry. On 15 July 2012, Hawkins-Turner appeared on the TLC television series Strange Sex. She has also appeared on The Jenny Jones Show. As Norma Stitz, she has made approximately 250 softcore pornography films. She describes herself as a "fantasy model", adding: "No hardcore, that means no sex." Her video "The Amazing Norma Stitz" has been reviewed in Adult Video News.

Awards 
She was inducted into the 'BBW Hall of fame' in 2018.

Honors and recognition 

In 2016, Hawkins-Turner's likeness was included in a newly opened wax museum in Ha Long, Vietnam.

See also 

Bra size
Breast hypertrophy

References

External links 
 
 Annie Hawkins-Turner at LinkedIn

Living people
People from Atlanta
21st-century American women
African-American female models
American female adult models
Year of birth missing (living people)